Tyana, earlier known as Tuwana and Tuwanuwa was an ancient city in the Anatolian region of Cappadocia, in modern Kemerhisar, Niğde Province, Central Anatolia, Turkey. It was the capital of a Luwian-speaking Neo-Hittite kingdom in the 1st millennium BC.

Name

By the Hellenistic and Roman periods, the city was named Tyana, which was derived from its earlier Hittite name.

Location
The location of Tyana corresponds to the modern-day town of Kemerhisar in Niğde Province, Turkey.

The region around Tyana was known as Tyanitis, and it corresponded to roughly the same area as the former Iron Age kingdom of Tuwana, which extended to the Cilician Gates and the kingdom of Quwê in the south, and in the north was bordered by the region of Tabal, which is sometimes considered part of Tuwana.

History

Hittite period
Tyana is the city referred to in Hittite archives as Tuwanuwa. During the Hittite Empire period in mid 2nd millennium, Tuwanuwa was among the principal settlements of the region along with Hupisna, Landa, Sahasara, Huwassana and Kuniyawanni. This south-central Anatolian region was referred to as the Lower Land in Hittite sources and its population was mainly Luwian speakers.

Neo-Hittite period
Following the collapse of the Hittite Empire, the city of Tuwana became the centre the Iron Age Luwian kingdom of Tuwana in southern Anatolia, one of the Syro-Hittite states, which existed in southeastern Anatolia in the 8th century BC.

It is not certain whether or not it was initially subject to the Tabal kingdom to its north, but certainly by the late 8th century BC it was an independent kingdom under a ruler named Warpalawa (in Assyrian sources Urballa). He figures in several hieroglyphic Luwian inscriptions found in the region, including a monumental rock carving in Ivriz. Warpalawa is also mentioned in Assyrian texts, under the name Urballa, first in a list of tributees of Assyrian king Tiglath Pileser III and later in a letter of Sargon II. Warpalawa was probably succeeded by his son Muwaharani whose name appears in another monument found in Niğde.

At this time, Tabal and Tuwana were tributaries of the Assyrian Empire of Tiglath-Pileser III. Simultaneously, strong influence from the kingdom of Mushki, ruled by King Mita (who is often identified with Midas of Phrygia, known from Greek sources) is evident. The Phrygian evidence is seen in two Old Phrygian inscriptions, which were found in Kemrhisar, and by bronze objects of clear Phrygian origin in a tumulus at Kaynarca, seven kilometres northeast of Tyana. In a letter of 715 BC, Sargon II describes how King Mita of Mushki had sent emissaries to the Assyrian governor in Quwê, Ašur-Šarru-Usur, asking for an exchange of ambassadors. The accompanying ambassadors of Warpalawas II (Akkadian: Urballa) are there described as messengers of one of Mita's vassals. A report of Ašur-Šarru-Usur to Sargon II indicates that Warpalawas conquered Bit Burutaš (part of Tabal) in 713 BC after King Ambaris of Tabal had been deposed and deported to Assyria. İvriz relief a stele of Tarḫunz with a Luwian-Phoenician bilingual text, which was found in 1986, shows that the North-Syrian Aramaic cultural area had a strong influence on the area as well. The Niğde Stele, which was erected by Warapalawas’ son, Muwaharani II, is clearly modelled on Assyrian steles. In the subsequent period, when both the Phrygian kingdom and the kingdom of Urartu to the east fell to the Cimmerians, there are no further traces of Tuwana.

Greek and Roman periods 

In Greek legend, the city was first called Thoana because Thoas, a Thracian king, was its founder (Arrian, Periplus Ponti Euxini, vi); it was in Cappadocia, at the foot of the Taurus Mountains and near the Cilician Gates (Strabo, XII, 537; XIII, 587).

Xenophon mentions it in his book Anabasis, under the name of Dana, as a large and prosperous city. The surrounding plain was known after it as Tyanitis.

It is the reputed birthplace of the celebrated philosopher (and reputed saint or magician) Apollonius of Tyana in the first century AD. Ovid (Metamorphoses VIII) places the tale of Baucis and Philemon in the vicinity.

According to Strabo the city was known also as "Eusebeia at the Taurus". Under Roman Emperor Caracalla, the city became Antoniana colonia Tyana. After having sided with Queen Zenobia of Palmyra, it was captured by Aurelian in 272, who would not allow his soldiers to sack it, allegedly because Apollonius appeared to him, pleading for its safety.

Late Roman and Byzantine periods 
In 372, Emperor Valens split the province of Cappadocia in two, and Tyana became the capital and metropolis of Cappadocia Secunda. In Late Antiquity, the city was also known as Christoupolis ("city of Christ").

Following the Muslim conquests and the establishment of the frontier between the Byzantine Empire and the Caliphate along the Taurus Mountains, Tyana became important as a military base due to its strategic position on the road to Cilicia and Syria via the Cilician Gates, which lie some 30 km to the south. Consequently, the city was frequently targeted by Muslim raids. The city was first sacked by the Umayyads after a long siege in 708, and remained deserted for some time before being rebuilt. It was then occupied by the Abbasid caliph Harun al-Rashid in 806. Harun began converting the city into a military base and even erected a mosque there, but evacuated it after the Byzantine emperor Nikephoros I bought a peace.

The city was again taken and razed by the Abbasids under Al-Abbas ibn al-Ma'mun in 831. Abbas rebuilt the site three years later as an Abbasid military colony in preparation for Caliph al-Ma'mun's planned conquest of Byzantium, but after Ma'mun's sudden death in August 833 the campaign was abandoned by his successor al-Mu'tasim and the half-rebuilt city was razed again.

The city fell into decline after 933, as the Arab threat receded. The ruins of Tyana are at modern Kemerhisar, three miles south of Niğde; there are remains of a Roman aqueduct and of cave cemeteries and sepulchral grottoes.

Rulers of Neo-Hittite TuwanaChristian Marek, Peter Frei: Geschichte Kleinasiens in der Antike. München 2010, p. 802. 

 Warpalawas I (early 8th century BC)
 Saruwani I (mid-8th century BC)
 Muwaharani I (ca. 740)
 Warpalawas II (ca. 740-705)
 Muwaharani II (End of the 8th century BC)

Ecclesiastical history
As noted, in 372 Emperor Valens created the province of Cappadocia Secunda, of which Tyana became the metropolis. This aroused a violent controversy between Anthimus, Bishop of Tyana, and St. Basil of Caesarea, each of whom wished to have as many suffragan sees as possible. About 640 Tyana had three, and it was the same in the tenth century (Heinrich Gelzer, "Ungedruckte ... Texte der Notitiae episcopatum", 538, 554).

Le Quien mentions 28 bishops of Tyana, among whom were:
Eutychius, at Nice in 325
Anthimus, the rival of St. Basil
Aetherius, at Constantinople in 381
Theodore, the friend of St. John Chrysostom
Eutherius, the partisan of Nestorius, deposed and exiled in 431
Cyriacus, a Severian Monophysite.

In May 1359, Tyana still had a metropolitan (Mikelosich and Müller, "Acta patriarchatus Constantinopolitani", I, 505); in 1360 the metropolitan of Caesarea secured the administration of it (op. cit., 537). Thenceforth the see was titular.

In 2020, during excavations the archaeologists discovered an octagonal church and coins dated to the 4th century.

References

Bibliography
 Dietrich Berges, "Die Frühgeschichte Tyanas." In Dietrich Berges, Johannes Nollé, Tyana. Archäologisch-historische Untersuchungen zum südwestlichen Kappadokien. Rudolf Habelt Verlag, Bonn 2000, pp. 465–475.
 Tuwana. in Trevor Bryce, The Routledge Handbook of The People and Places of Ancient Western Asia. The Near East from the Early Bronze Age to the fall of the Persians Empire. Routledge, Abingdon 2009, p. 726 (on Google Books).

Sources

External links 
 Tyana in Turkey  Nigde city. Tyana and Apollonius
 Tyana (Kemerhisar) 

Archaeological sites in Central Anatolia
Catholic titular sees in Asia
Historical regions of Anatolia
Syro-Hittite states
Tabal
Former populated places in Turkey
Roman towns and cities in Turkey
Populated places in ancient Cappadocia
Populated places of the Byzantine Empire
Buildings and structures in Niğde Province
Tourist attractions in Niğde Province
History of Niğde Province
Coloniae (Roman)